Corey Hirsch (born July 1, 1972) is a Canadian former  professional ice hockey goaltender, currently working for Sportsnet as a colour commentator on Vancouver Canucks radio broadcasts.  He spent the majority of his National Hockey League career with the Vancouver Canucks.  He is the former goaltending coach for the St. Louis Blues, having previously served the Toronto Maple Leafs along with Francois Allaire.

Hirsch is tied with Tyson Sexsmith for most wins in the Western Hockey League's history, with 120.

Playing career
Born  in Medicine Hat, Alberta, Hirsch played major junior hockey with the Kamloops Blazers of the Western Hockey League for four seasons. He was named to the WHL Second All-Star Team in his second season with Kamloops, in which the team won the President's Cup (now the Ed Chynoweth Cup) and advanced to the 1990 Memorial Cup in Hamilton, Ontario, where the Blazers placed third. Hirsch was subsequently chosen 169th overall in the 1991 NHL Entry Draft by the New York Rangers.

Upon being drafted, Hirsch led the league in shutouts, with 5, and goals against average with 2.72 in 1991–92, he was named CHL Goaltender of the Year and the Del Wilson Trophy as the WHL Goaltender of the Year. As the Blazers again captured President's Cup in 1992, they advanced to the Memorial Cup in Seattle and defeated the Sault Ste. Marie Greyhounds 5–4 in the final. Hirsch was additionally awarded the Hap Emms Memorial Trophy as the tournament's top goaltender.

In 1992–93, his first professional season, he played for the Binghamton Rangers, New York's AHL affiliate, and won the Aldege "Baz" Bastien Memorial Award as the league's top goalie.  At 2.79, he was also awarded the Harry "Hap" Holmes Memorial Award for the lowest goals-against-average (shared with goaltending teammate Boris Rousson).

Hirsch started his first NHL game that season, a 2–2 tie against the Detroit Red Wings on January 19, 1993. He recorded his first win on his next start, an 8–3 victory over the Los Angeles Kings on January 23.

At the 1994 Winter Olympics in Lillehammer, Norway, Hirsch played all eight games for Canada and won a silver medal after losing in a shootout to Sweden in the gold medal game. The shootout-winning goal by Peter Forsberg was depicted on a Swedish postage stamp, featuring the image of a generic goalie because Hirsch refused to allow his likeness to be used.

Hirsch remained with Binghamton for three seasons until New York traded him to the Vancouver Canucks on April 7, 1995, in exchange for forward Nathan LaFayette.

Hirsch split goaltending duties with Kirk McLean in 1995–96 and was named to the All-Rookie Team after posting a 2.93 goals-against average, .903 save percentage and a winning 17–14–6 record. He also finished fifth in Calder Memorial Trophy voting (won by Daniel Alfredsson). During the season, he recorded his first career NHL shutout on January 15, 1996, a 6–0 win against the Boston Bruins.

On July 2, 1999, he was waived by the Canucks and for the next few seasons, would bounce around the league between the Nashville Predators, Mighty Ducks of Anaheim, Washington Capitals, and Dallas Stars. Playing for minor league affiliates, he only appeared in a handful of NHL games for the remainder of his career. In 2002–03, he recorded AHL career highs with a 2.64 goals-against average and a .921 save percentage in 35 games with the Utah Grizzlies.

Before retiring, Hirsch played three seasons overseas in the Swedish Elitserien, and the German Deutsche Eishockey Liga.

Post-playing career
After retiring, Hirsch became a goaltending consultant for Hockey Canada. He worked with the national junior team as part of the 2007 and 2008 World Junior gold medal winning teams.

On September 9, 2008, the Toronto Maple Leafs announced they had hired Hirsch as their goaltending coach.

On June 18, 2010, the St. Louis Blues announced they had hired Hirsch as their goaltending coach.

On May 7, 2014, the St. Louis Blues relieved Hirsch of his coaching duties.

In 2015, Hirsch joined the NHL on Sportsnet as a freelance TV analyst.

Personal
Hirsch is a divorcee after 15 years of marriage, with three children. In the summer of 2015, Hirsch's son Hayden, who is a forward, attended hockey training camp with his father's old junior team, the Kamloops Blazers, but didn't make the regular season roster. Hirsch has struggled with severe anxiety and Obsessive-Compulsive Disorder (OCD) for much of his life, and described his struggle in a Player's Tribune article on February 15, 2017 and a video for the Canucks' Hockey Talks initiative. He has since become an outspoken advocate for mental health awareness and ending the stigma associated with mental illness.

Awards
Major Junior
WHL West Second All-Star Team – 1990 
WHL West First All-Star Team – 1991 & 1992
CHL Goaltender of the Year – 1992
CHL First All-Star Team – 1992
Hap Emms Memorial Trophy (WHL goaltender of the year) – 1992 
Del Wilson Trophy (Memorial Cup top goaltender) – 1992 
Memorial Cup All-Star Team – 1992

Professional
Aldege "Baz" Bastien Memorial Award (AHL goaltender of the year) – 1993 
Dudley "Red" Garrett Memorial Award (AHL's lowest goals-against-average) – 1993 (shared with Boris Rousson)
Harry "Hap" Holmes Memorial Award – 1993 
AHL First All-Star Team – 1993
NHL All-Rookie Team – 1996 
IHL Goaltender of the Month – December 1999
IHL Goaltender of the Week – December 4, December 18, 2000

Career statistics

Regular season and playoffs

International

References

External links

1972 births
Albany River Rats players
Binghamton Rangers players
Calgary Canucks players
Canadian ice hockey goaltenders
Dallas Stars players
Ice hockey people from Alberta
Ice hockey players at the 1994 Winter Olympics
Kamloops Blazers players
Kassel Huskies players
Living people
Malmö Redhawks players
Medalists at the 1994 Winter Olympics
New York Rangers draft picks
New York Rangers players
Olympic ice hockey players of Canada
Olympic medalists in ice hockey
Olympic silver medalists for Canada
Sportspeople from Medicine Hat
Philadelphia Phantoms players
Portland Pirates players
St. Louis Blues coaches
Syracuse Crunch players
Timrå IK players
Toronto Maple Leafs coaches
Vancouver Canucks players
Washington Capitals players
Canadian expatriate ice hockey players in Germany
Canadian expatriate ice hockey players in Sweden
Canadian ice hockey coaches